Q'isanani (Aymara q'isana barn; totora mat, -ni a suffix to indicate ownership, "the one with a barn" or "the one with a mat", Hispanicized spelling Quesanane) is a mountain in the Andes of southern Peru, about  high. It is situated in the Puno Region, Puno Province, San Antonio District. Q'isanani lies northwest of the mountain Wankarani and east of Qutuni.

References

Mountains of Puno Region
Mountains of Peru